Winged monkeys are fictional characters that first appeared in the 1900 children's novel The Wonderful Wizard of Oz, by American author L. Frank Baum. They are described as jungle monkeys with bird-like feathered wings. They are playful, intelligent, and speak English. The winged monkeys are initially under the control of the Wicked Witch of the West, but are later controlled by the protagonist, Dorothy Gale. They lift up Dorothy and fly her to two distant locations.

Winged monkeys next appeared in the 1939 musical film adaption of the novel, The Wizard of Oz. In the film they have a much smaller role than in the book, and do not speak, but their appearance introduced the concept to a wider audience. After 1939, similar characters have appeared in numerous books, films, computer games and other popular media.

Based on the description in the original book, the related term flying monkey has been adopted in psychology, where it refers to someone who performs enabling work on behalf of an abusive person.

Wizard of Oz

The Wonderful Wizard of Oz book (1900)

The winged monkeys started out as free creatures living in the jungles in the Land of Oz. They were a rather carefree but mischievous bunch, until their king, as a prank, tossed a richly dressed man into a deep river, ruining his velvet costume. His fiancée, Princess Gayelette, was furious since this was their wedding day. She had ruled Oz's northern quadrant, Gillikin Country, and was a sorceress. As punishment for the prank, she enslaved them and made them obey the Golden Cap. Any wearer of the cap could make three demands of the monkeys. Later, this cap fell into the hands of the Wicked Witch of the West, who used it to make the monkeys help her in conquering Oz's western quadrant (the Winkie Country), enslave the native Winkies, and drive the Wizard of Oz out of her territory when he attempted to overthrow her. 

After Dorothy Gale kills the Wicked Witch, she put on the cap, unaware of its power. When she learns its power, she uses it to influence the winged monkeys to transport her and her companions to the Emerald City. Then Dorothy asked them to carry her back to Kansas, but the winged monkeys could not leave the magical realm of Oz; thus the second request was wasted. Dorothy's third and final request was for them to carry her and her company over the rocky mountains inhabited by the Hammer-Heads, who would not let them pass over their turf.

Dorothy ends up handing the Golden Cap over to Glinda, the beautiful Good Witch of the South. Glinda then ordered the winged monkeys to carry Dorothy's companions back to their new homes in Oz after Dorothy's departure, and then to simply cease to bother people and not play pranks on them anymore. She then gave the winged monkeys the cap as their own, breaking the curse and setting them free.

The Wizard of Oz film (1939)
In the 1939 film The Wizard of Oz, the monkeys are apparently intelligent enough to obey commands, but do not speak as they do in the book. They abduct Dorothy and her dog Toto and dismantle the Scarecrow, but do nothing to the Tin Man or the Cowardly Lion, leaving them free to put the Scarecrow back together and rescue Dorothy. There is no mention of any three wishes in the film, suggesting that the monkeys serve the witch unconditionally. Nikko (the short winged head monkey, played by Pat Walshe) is shown after being ordered by the Witch to throw a basket containing Toto in a river; an order that Dorothy prevents him from carrying out. Nikko is also shown with the Witch as she angrily throws down the hour glass after the Scarecrow, Tin Man, and Cowardly Lion rescue Dorothy, and once more after the Witch has melted.

There is only a brief glimpse of the Golden Cap in the film: after Dorothy and the Lion awake after Glinda breaks the spell on the poppies conjured by the Witch, she is seen watching them in anger in her crystal ball. Nikko hands her the Golden Cap and she utters the "somebody always helps that girl" line, before throwing the cap across the room angrily. The reason for this brief appearance comes from a scene deleted from the final film. In the script, after the Witch conjures up the poppies that put Dorothy, Toto, and the Lion to sleep, she orders Nikko to fetch the Golden Cap so she can summon the winged monkeys and they can take the Ruby Slippers from the sleeping girl. However, she never gets a chance as the spell is broken before she can. Why the Witch doesn't use the Golden Cap to summon the monkeys when she sends them off into the Winkie Forest to capture Dorothy and Toto is unknown. In the film, the cap looks almost identical to the original artwork by W. W. Denslow in the book.

Appearances in later media

 In the Jumanji film, when a pack of monkeys that were released from the boardgame come across an electronics store where the TVs are playing the 1939 film scene featuring the Winged Monkeys, they begin hopping like in the movie along with stealing the television sets from the store.
 In the film version of The Wiz, the African-American rock adaptation of The Wizard of Oz, the flying monkeys are a motorcycle gang, whose leader is named Cheetah, after the Tarzan character. Their metal wings are part of their motorcycles, but these apparently dissolved with the witch's other magic, as they are absent when carrying Dorothy and her friends back to the Emerald City.
 In 1976, two statues of winged monkeys were erected on the rooftop of a mattress store called "Emerald City of Oz" in Burlington, Vermont. In 1996, the statues were moved to the roof of Union Station (now Main Street Landing), and statues of baby monkeys were added in the winter of 2004–2005. Two more statues of winged monkeys were installed on the roof of the nearby Waterfront Theatre in the 1990s.
 The winged monkeys subsequently appear in the early 1990s cartoon version of The Wizard of Oz, with one of them named Truckle (voiced by Pat Fraley) serving as the Wicked Witch of the West's chief sidekick. He is shown as capable of speech and even gets to wear the Ruby Slippers for a brief time. Truckle led the winged monkeys that were loyal to the Wicked Witch of the West into performing a ritual that would resurrect her.
 In Gregory Maguire's revisionist novels Wicked: The Life and Times of the Wicked Witch of the West and Son of a Witch, the flying monkeys were created by Elphaba (the Witch) as part of her experiments on the nature of the soul and what distinguishes non-speaking animals from Animals.  In these novels, most of the flying monkeys cannot speak, but Elphaba's favorite (named Chistery), has a distinctive speech pattern characterized by the repetition of similar-sounding words. This speech pattern becomes less pronounced in A Lion Among Men and Out of Oz, the third and fourth volumes in Maguire's "Wicked Years" cycle.
 In The Muppets' Wizard of Oz, the winged monkeys had been a rather peaceful group of "motorcycle enthusiasts" and are played by Sal Minella, Sweetums, Crazy Harry, Black Dog, Calico, Old Tom, Spotted Dick, and Aretha from Fraggle Rock. The winged monkeys were placed under the Wicked Witch of the West's control when she took possession of their Magic Biker Cap. Forced to do her bidding, the winged monkeys rode their motorcycles through the skies of Oz, performing the Wicked Witch of the West's dirty work. Once she was defeated upon melting in a bathtub filled with tap water, Dorothy returned the Magic Biker Cap to Sal Minella, thereby restoring the winged monkeys' independence.
 The 2007 Sci Fi television miniseries Tin Man depicts a re-imagining of Baum's world of Oz, including bat-winged monkeys called "mobats" that are the familiars of the sorceress Azkadellia which come from tattoos on her chest.
 In Bill Willingham's Vertigo comic book series Fables, a winged monkey named Bufkin is a clerk and librarian in the Business Office belonging to the government of Fabletown, a community of refugee fairy-tale characters ("Fables") living in modern-day New York City. It has yet to be revealed how he became a citizen of Fabletown, but it is known that Oz is one of the mythical "Homelands" conquered by the Adversary that forced many Fables to flee to the "real" world, and was given over to the Nome King to rule in the Adversary's name.  Though somewhat scatter-brained, lacking in wisdom, and partial to alcohol when he can find it, Bufkin has a surprising amount of knowledge gleaned from the vast array of reference material in the library.  After becoming separated from Fabletown and losing his wings in a conflict with the witch Baba Yaga, Bufkin eventually makes his way back to the lands of the Oz books, and in the wake of the Adversary's defeat by Fabletown, leads an uprising that deposes the Nome King's rule. Bufkin goes on to have other adventures across the Homelands before settling down in his old age and dying of natural causes.
 Winged monkeys or flying monkeys have been mentioned in television series such as The Simpsons, Buffy the Vampire Slayer and Two and a Half Men, and have appeared or been referenced in films such as Hunter, Wayne's World, Jumanji and Inkheart.
 The winged monkeys appear in Dorothy and the Witches of Oz.
 Beyond Oz, winged apes called "clakars" appear in While the Gods Laugh by Michael Moorcock, the second published novelette featuring his character Elric of Melniboné; the novelette was later republished in different collections.
 In the 2012 film The Avengers, after Clint Barton and Erik Selvig are hypnotized, Nick Fury refers to them as Loki's "personal flying monkeys". At this remark, the Asgardian hero Thor (who does not originate from Earth) is confused, not having read or seen The Wizard of Oz, whilst Captain America excitedly announces that he understood the reference, as it was already popular before he was frozen during World War II.
The winged monkeys were referred to by the Master Creator, Michael Blaine.
 The winged monkeys appear in Oz the Great and Powerful. Oscar Diggs befriended a winged monkey named Finley (voiced by Zach Braff) after using an illusion to save him from a lion. The film also included Winged Baboons which make up the armies of Theodora and Evanora. Unlike Finley who can speak and behave like a human, the Winged Baboons are feral, vicious and cannot speak. The Baboons have leathery bat-like wings, whereas Finley has elegant wings like a swan.
 In the music video "Heretics and Killers" by Canadian band Protest The Hero, the band is seen performing in the monkey suits. A newspaper at the beginning also indicates the monkeys are out of work so they try working and other things to make money.
 The winged monkeys appear in the third season of Once Upon a Time. The Wicked Witch of the West sends one out to collect a sample of the Evil Queen's blood for her potion. The Wicked Witch sent a winged monkey to make her presence known to the Evil Queen. Before it can attack Robin Hood's son Roland, the Evil Queen turned it into a plush toy and gave it to Roland. Another winged monkey assumes the form of a man named Walsh (played by Christopher Gorham) and becomes in a relationship with Emma Swan for eight months. However, when she declines his marriage proposal to go to Storybrooke, he reveals his true form and attacks Emma. Emma fights back and knocks him off a building, though he vanishes into smoke before he can hit the ground. When Emma is back in Storybrooke, the winged monkeys start taking its inhabitants one by one in order to be converted into winged monkeys. In "It's Not Easy Being Green", it was revealed that Walsh was the previous Wizard of Oz before being turned into a flying monkey by the Wicked Witch of the West. After the Wicked Witch's defeat, everyone who was turned into a flying monkey return to their human forms.
 The winged monkeys appeared in the 2013 animated film Legends of Oz: Dorothy's Return (based on Dorothy of Oz) with their vocal effects provided by Scott Menville, Alan Shearman, Randi Soyland, and Flip Waterman. The winged monkeys are servants of the Jester where the flying monkey named "You" (voiced by Randi Soyland) is his main servant.
 A winged monkey skin exists for Brightwing in Heroes of the Storm. More of the creatures are said to inhabit its Luxorian setting.
 The flying monkeys appear in the Lego Dimensions video game. The flying monkeys are only affected by their master the Wicked Witch of the West, witnessed the disappearing of Dorothy via the vortex and battle Gandalf, Batman, and Wyldstyle.
 In a Danny Shanahan cartoon from the New Yorker (September 26, 2016), a surgeon tells a flying monkey that the witch is dead by touching him on the shoulder and saying, "Ding-dong."
 The flying monkeys also make a cameo appearance in The Lego Batman Movie. They appear alongside the Wicked Witch of the West and various other villains in the Phantom Zone. One of the Monkeys spoke during the film where he told Joker to get on with his plan to get out of the Phantom Zone. The flying monkeys are later seen alongside the other villains attacking Gotham City.
 In the ITV (and PBS) sitcom Vicious, Freddie (Ian McKellen), who incessantly insults Mildred (Hazel Stewart), the mother of his partner Stuart (Derek Jacobi), observes that one can be sure that Stuart's mother has indeed arrived if one looks out the window and sees flying monkeys.
 The Flying Monkeys appear in Dorothy and the Wizard of Oz. Some of them are on the side of the Wicked Witch of the West's niece Wilhemina and are often led by Wilhelmina's Flying Monkey minions Frank and Lyman (voiced by Steve Blum and Jess Harnell).
 In the third volume of Shazam!, the winged monkeys are shown as inhabitants of the Magiclands location called the Wozenderlands. Working for the Wicked Witches of the North, South, East, and West, they pursue the White Rabbit in order to take him prisoner. The White Rabbit runs from the winged monkeys and is saved from them by Mamaragan, Eugene Choi, and Pedro Peña.
 In The Super Hero Squad Show episode "Night in the Sanctorum!", Enchantress uses her magic to create an illusion of "winged primates of peril" (with real exploding fruit) to bombard Super Hero City so the Lethal Legion can seek the wreckage for Infinity Fractals.
 In the 2017 series Emerald City, the Flying Monkeys are mechanical creatures that the Wizard uses to spy on his subjects that can record and play what they have seen.
 In the Amazon Video series Lost in Oz, the Flying Monkeys are just regular monkeys with jetpack robotic wings who serve Fitz, the apprentice of Langwidere.
 Although not a direct adaptation to the literature itself, the 2013 Super Sentai series, Zyuden Sentai Kyoryuger features the Deboth Army's members being themed after the characters in The Wonderful Wizard of Oz. Resentful Knight Endolf is designed with the motif of winged monkeys, whose possession of Dogold's shock restrains parallels his source of inspiration's fate of being enslaved to the Golden Cap.

In psychology
The term flying monkey has been used in psychology to refer to enablers of an abusive person, such as a narcissist or a sociopath. It particularly indicates someone who does work on the behalf of the abuser, as the winged monkeys do for the witch in the original book.

The abuser will typically use family, friends, or coworkers who are loyal and/or subservient to them as flying monkeys to subvert or attack their intended targets. The flying monkey may act as a courier of information between parties, or as someone who pleads the case on behalf of the abuser. The flying monkeys themselves might buy into the abuser's false personality, might be too afraid of the abuser to stand up to them, or may themselves suffer from a mental disorder that the abuser exploits, such as having narcissistic or sociopathic tendencies themselves.

References

Fictional monkeys
Fictional kidnappers
Animals of Oz
Literary characters introduced in 1900
Talking animals in fiction
Literary villains
Male characters in literature